The South American Super Touring Car Championship (known locally as the Copa de las Naciones Super Turismo then as the Copa de Superturismo Sudamericano) was an international touring car racing series in South America which used FIA Super Touring regulations.

Champions

 Bueno and Spataro had identical numbers of wins, places down to seventh and pole positions, so were declared joint champions.

Notable drivers

 Oscar Larrauri
 Miguel Ángel Guerra
 Ingo Hoffmann
 Juan Manuel Fangio II
 Gonzalo Rodríguez
 Osvaldo Lopez

See also
 TCR South America Touring Car Championship

References

Touring car racing series
Motorsport in South America
Defunct auto racing series